The automotive industry in Japan is one of the most prominent and largest industries in the world.  Japan has been in the top three of the countries with most cars manufactured since the 1960s, surpassing Germany.  The automotive industry in Japan rapidly increased from the 1970s to the 1990s (when it was oriented both for domestic use and worldwide export) and in the 1980s and 1990s, overtook the U.S. as the production leader with up to 13 million cars per year manufactured and significant exports.  After massive ramp-up by China in the 2000s and fluctuating U.S. output, Japan is currently the third largest automotive producer in the world with an annual production of 9.9 million automobiles in 2012. Japanese investments helped grow the auto industry in many countries throughout the last few decades.

Japanese business conglomerates began building their first automobiles in the middle to late 1910s. The companies went about this by either designing their own trucks (the market for passenger vehicles in Japan at the time was small), or partnering with a European brand to produce and sell their cars in Japan under license. Such examples of this are Isuzu partnering with Wolseley Motors (UK), Nissan partnering with British automaker Austin, and the Mitsubishi Model A, which was based upon the Fiat Tipo 3. The demand for domestic trucks was greatly increased by the Japanese military buildup before World War II, causing many Japanese manufacturers to break out of their shells and design their own vehicles.  In the 1970s Japan was the pioneer in the use of robotics in the manufacturing of vehicles.

The country is home to a number of companies that produce cars, construction vehicles, motorcycles, ATVs, and engines. Japanese automotive manufacturers include Toyota, Honda, Daihatsu, Nissan, Suzuki, Mazda, Mitsubishi, Subaru, Isuzu, Hino, Kawasaki, Yamaha, and Mitsuoka. Infiniti, Acura, and Lexus are luxury brands of Nissan, Honda and Toyota.

Cars designed in Japan have won the European Car of the Year, International Car of the Year, and World Car of the Year awards many times. Japanese vehicles have had worldwide influence, and no longer have the stigma they had in the 1950s and 1960s when they first emerged internationally, due to a dedicated focus on continual product and process improvement led by Toyota as well as the use of the Five Whys technique and the early adoption of the Lean Six Sigma methodology. Japanese cars are also built in compliance with Japanese Government dimension regulations and engine displacement is further regulated by road tax bracket regulations, which also affects any imported cars sold in Japan.

History

Early years
In 1904, Torao Yamaha produced the first domestically manufactured bus, which was powered by a steam engine.  In 1907, Komanosuke Uchiyama produced the Takuri, the first entirely Japanese-made gasoline engine car.  The Kunisue Automobile Works built the Kunisue in 1910, and the following year manufactured the Tokyo in cooperation with Tokyo Motor Vehicles Ltd.  In 1911, Kaishinsha Motorcar Works was established and later began manufacturing a car called the DAT.  In 1920, Jitsuyo Jidosha Seizo Co., founded by William R. Gorham, began building the Gorham and later the Lila.  The company merged with Kaishinsha in 1926 to form the DAT Automobile Manufacturing Co. (later to evolve into Nissan Motors).  From 1924 to 1927, Hakuyosha Ironworks Ltd. built the Otomo.  Toyota, a textile manufacturer, began building cars in 1936. Most early vehicles, however, were trucks produced under military subsidy. Isuzu, Yanmar and Daihatsu initially focused on diesel engine development.

Cars built in Japan before World War II tended to be based on European or American models. The 1917 Mitsubishi Model A was based on the Fiat A3-3 design.  (This model was considered to be the first mass-produced car in Japan, with 22 units produced.)  In the 1930s, Nissan Motors' cars were based on the Austin 7 and Graham-Paige designs, while the Toyota AA model was based on the Chrysler Airflow. Ohta built cars in the 1930s based on Ford models, while Chiyoda and Sumida, a predecessor of Isuzu, built cars resembling General Motors products 1935 Pontiac, and 1930s LaSalle.

Automobile manufacture from Japanese companies was struggling, despite investment efforts by the Japanese Government. The 1923 Great Kantō earthquake devastated most of Japan's fledgling infrastructure and truck and construction equipment manufacturing benefited from recovery efforts. Yanase & Co., Ltd. (株式会社ヤナセ Yanase Kabushiki gaisha) was an importer of American-made cars to Japan and contributed to disaster recovery efforts by importing GMC trucks and construction equipment. By bringing in American products, Japanese manufacturers were able to examine the imported vehicles and develop their own products.

Transportation and mobilization in the early 1900s was largely monopolized by the Japanese Government's Ministry of Railways, and private automobile companies emerged to further modernize the transportation infrastructure.

From 1925 until the beginning of World War II, Ford and GM had factories in the country and they dominated the Japanese market. The Ford Motor Company of Japan was established in 1925 and a production plant was set up in Yokohama.  General Motors established operations in Osaka in 1927.  Chrysler also came to Japan and set up Kyoritsu Motors.  Between 1925 and 1936, the United States Big Three automakers' Japanese subsidiaries produced a total of 208,967 vehicles, compared to the domestic producers total of 12,127 vehicles.  In 1936, the Japanese government passed the Automobile Manufacturing Industry Law, which was intended to promote the domestic auto industry and reduce foreign competition; ironically, this stopped the groundbreaking of an integrated Ford plant in Yokohama, modeled on Dagenham in England and intended to serve the Asian market, that would have established Japan as a major exporter.  Instead by 1939, the foreign manufacturers had been forced out of Japan.  Under the direction of the Imperial Japanese Government, the fledgling vehicle production efforts were redirected to heavy duty truck production due to the Second Sino-Japanese War and the Isuzu TX was the result of three Japanese companies combining efforts to manufacture a standardized, military grade heavy duty truck.

During World War II, Toyota, Nissan, Isuzu and Kurogane built trucks and motorcycles for the Imperial Japanese Army, with Kurogane introducing the world's first mass-produced four-wheel-drive car, called the Kurogane Type 95 in 1936. For the first decade after World War II, auto production was limited, and until 1966 most production consisted of trucks (including three-wheeled vehicles). Thereafter passenger cars dominated the market. Japanese car designs also continued to imitate or be derived from European and American designs. Exports were very limited in the 1950s, adding up to only 3.1% of the total passenger car production of the decade.

1960s to today
In the 1960s Japanese manufacturers began to compete head-on in the domestic market, model for model. This was exemplified by the "CB-war" between the most popular compact sedans called the Toyota Corona and the Nissan Bluebird. While this initially led to benefits for consumers, before long R&D expenditures swelled and other companies offered competing compact sedans from Mazda, Subaru, Isuzu, Daihatsu and Mitsubishi. Towards the late 1980s and early 1990s Japanese automobile manufacturers had entered a stage of "Hyper-design" and "Hyper-equipment"; an arms race leading to less competitive products albeit produced in a highly efficient manner.

During the 1960s, Japanese automakers launched a bevy of new kei cars in their domestic market; scooters and motorcycles remained dominant, with sales of 1.47 million in 1960 versus a mere 36,000 kei cars. These tiny automobiles usually featured very small engines (under 360cc, but were sometimes fitted with engines of up to 600cc for export) to keep taxes much lower than larger cars. The average person in Japan was now able to afford an automobile, which boosted sales dramatically and jumpstarted the auto industry toward becoming what it is today. The first of this new era, actually launched in 1958, was the Subaru 360. It was known as the "Lady Beetle", comparing its significance to the Volkswagen Beetle in Germany. Other significant models were the Suzuki Fronte, Daihatsu Fellow Max, Mitsubishi Minica, Mazda Carol, and the Honda N360.

The keis were very minimalist motoring, however, much too small for most family car usage. The most popular economy car segment in the sixties was the 700-800 cc class, embodied by the Toyota Publica, Mitsubishi Colt 800, and the original Mazda Familia. By the end of the sixties, however, these (often two-stroke) cars were being replaced by full one-litre cars with four-stroke engines, a move which was spearheaded by Nissan's 1966 Sunny. All other manufacturers quickly followed suit, except for Toyota who equipped their Corolla with a 1.1-litre engine - the extra 100 cc were heavily touted in period advertising. These small family cars took a bigger and bigger share of an already expanding market. All vehicles sold in Japan were taxed yearly based on exterior dimensions and engine displacement. This was established by legislation passed in 1950 that established tax brackets on two classifications; dimension regulations and engine displacement. The taxes were a primary consideration as to which vehicles were selected by Japanese consumers, and guided manufacturers as to what type of vehicles the market would buy.

Export expansion

Exports of passenger cars increased nearly two hundred-fold in the sixties compared to the previous decade, and were now up to 17.0 percent of the total production. This though, was still only the beginning. Rapidly increasing domestic demand and the expansion of Japanese car companies into foreign markets in the 1970s further accelerated growth. Effects of the 1973 Arab Oil Embargo accelerated vehicle exports along with the exchange rate of the Japanese yen to the U.S. Dollar, UK Pound, and West German Deutsche Mark. Passenger car exports rose from 100,000 in 1965 to 1,827,000 in 1975. Automobile production in Japan continued to increase rapidly after the 1970s, as Mitsubishi (as Dodge vehicles) and Honda began selling their vehicles in the US. Even more brands came to America and abroad during the 1970s, and by the 1980s, the Japanese manufacturers were gaining a major foothold in the US and world markets.

In the early 1970s, the Japanese electronics manufacturers began producing integrated circuits (ICs), microprocessors and microcontrollers for the automobile industry, including ICs and microcontrollers for in-car entertainment, automatic wipers, electronic locks, dashboard, and engine control. The Japanese automobile industry widely adopted ICs years before the American automobile industry.

Japanese cars became popular with British buyers in the early 1970s, with Nissan's Datsun badged cars (the Nissan brand was not used on British registered models until 1983) proving especially popular and earning a reputation in Britain for their reliability and low running costs, although rust was a major problem. Exports were successful enough that Japanese cars were considered a severe threat to many national car industries, such as Italy, France, the United Kingdom, as well as the United States. Import quotas were imposed in several countries, limiting the sales of Japanese-made cars to 3 percent of the overall market in France and 1.5 percent in Italy. As for the United States, the Japanese government was pressured to agree to annual export quotas beginning in 1981. In other countries, such as the United Kingdom, Japanese importers made gentlemen's agreements to limit import in an effort to forestall stricter official quotas. As a result, Japanese manufacturers expanded local production of cars, establishing plants across North America and Europe while also taking advantage of plants already created in third countries not covered by the quotas. Thus, South African-built Daihatsu Charades were sold in Italy and a number of Australian-made Mitsubishis found their way to North America and Europe.

World leader

With Japanese manufacturers producing very affordable, reliable, and popular cars throughout the 1990s, Japan became the largest car producing nation in the world in 2000. However, its market share has decreased slightly in recent years, particularly  due to old and new competition from South Korea, China and India.  Nevertheless, Japan's car industry continues to flourish, its market share has risen again, and in the first quarter of 2008 Toyota surpassed American General Motors to become the world's largest car manufacturer. Today, Japan is the third largest automobile market(below the United States and China) and is the second largest car producer in the world with its branded cars being among the most used ones internationally. Automobile export remains one of the country's most profitable exports and is a cornerstone of recovery plan for the latest economic crisis. In 2019 Japan was the second largest car exporter in the world.

Timeline 

1907 - Hatsudoki Seizo Co., Ltd. established
1911 - Kaishinsha Motorcar Works established
1917 - Mitsubishi Motors' 1st car
1917 - Nippon Internal Combustion Engine Co. Ltd. established (integrated into Nissan)
1918 - Isuzu's 1st car
1920-1925 - Gorham/Lila - auto production established (merged into Datsun)
1924-1927 - Otomo built at the Hakuyosha Ironworks in Tokyo
1931 - Mazda-Go - by Toyo Kogyo corp, later Mazda
1934-1957 - Ohta begins auto production
1936 - Kurogane Type 95 world's first four-wheel-drive car manufactured
1936 - Toyota's 1st car (Toyota AA)
1952-1966 - Prince Motor Company (integrated into Nissan)
1953-1967 - Hino Motors starts auto production (merged into Toyota)
1954 - Subaru's 1st car (Subaru P-1)
1955 - Suzuki's 1st car (Suzulight)
1957 - Daihatsu's 1st car (Daihatsu Midget)
1963 - Honda's 1st production car (Honda S500)
1966 - One of the best selling cars of all time, the Toyota Corolla, is introduced; Nissan opens its first North American manufacturing facility in Cuernavaca, Mexico as Nissan Mexicana
1967 - Japan Automobile Manufacturers Association (JAMA) is founded
1967 - Mazda Cosmo 110S was one of the first two mass-produced cars with Wankel rotary engine
1977 - Voluntary Export Restraints limit exports to the United Kingdom for five years; the deal was renewed until 1999
1980 - Japan surpassed the United States and became first in auto manufacturing; Nissan USA breaks ground for its Smyrna, Tennessee, manufacturing plant
1981 - Voluntary Export Restraints from May limit exports to United States to 1.68 million cars per year; redundant by 1990 as production inside US displaces direct exports; similar policies in several EU countries
1982 - Honda Accord becomes the first Japanese car built in the United States at Honda's Marysville, Ohio, manufacturing facility
1982 - Mitsuoka 1st car (BUBU shuttle 50)
1983 - Holden and Nissan form a joint venture in Australia; Nissan Sunny (Sentra) assembled at Nissan's Smyrna, Tennessee, facility
1984 - Toyota opens NUMMI, the first joint venture plant in the United States with General Motors
1986 - Acura is launched in the US by Honda
1988 - Daihatsu enters the US making it the first time all nine Japanese manufacturers are present; Toyota Camry becomes third Japanese car manufactured at Toyota's Erlanger, Kentucky, assembly plant
1989 - Lexus is launched in the US by Toyota
1989 - Infiniti is launched in the US by Nissan
1989 - United Australian Automobile Industries (UAAI) founded in Australia as a joint venture between Toyota and Holden 
1991 - Mazda HR-X was one of the first hydrogen (combined with Wankel rotary) car
1994 - Japan conceded to the United States back in auto manufacturing
1996 - UAAI joint venture dissolved
1997 - Toyota Prius was the first mass-produced hybrid car
2003 - Scion is launched by Toyota
2004 - Mitsubishi defects cover-up scandal
2006 - Japan surpassed the United States and became first in auto manufacturing again
2008 - Toyota surpassed General Motors to become the world's largest car manufacturer.
2008 - Japanese automotive industry afflicted by the financial crisis caused by the Great Recession at the first time.
2009 - Japan was surpassed by China and became second in automotive manufacturing.
2010 - 2009–2010 Toyota vehicle recalls
2011 - March 2011 earthquake and tsunami and the Fukushima nuclear disaster affects Japanese automotive production at the second time.
2012 - At the beginning of Abenomics from 2012 to 2020, Japanese Prime Minister Shinzo Abe's program to help the country's economic recovery including the automotive industry: Japanese economics side is one part of a more general program, which was commented on by Joseph Stiglitz.
2020 - COVID-19 pandemic affects Japanese automotive production at the third time, which Japan had encountered its worst economic crisis since the end of World War II.

Statistics

Production volumes by manufacturer

The following are vehicle production volumes for Japanese vehicle manufacturers, according to the Japan Automobile Manufacturers Association (JAMA).

Sales rank

Regular cars

Kei cars

See also

 List of automobile manufacturers of Japan
 Automotive industry
 Japanese used vehicle exporting
 Timeline of Japanese automobiles

Notes

References

Further reading
  Odaka, Konosuke. The automobile industry in Japan : a study of ancillary firm development (1988) online

 

 Videos

External links
 The Society of Automotive Engineers of Japan (JSAE) "240 Landmarks of Japanese Automotive Technology"
 Japan Automotive Daily (Nikkan Jidosha Shimbun in English)